Gymnoscelis celebensis is a moth in the family Geometridae. It was described by Louis Beethoven Prout in 1958. It is found on Sulawesi, Seram and Borneo. The habitat consists of primary forests.

References

Moths described in 1958
celebensis
Moths of Asia